The 2006 Kīholo Bay earthquake occurred on October 15 at  with a magnitude of 6.7 and a maximum Mercalli intensity of VIII (Severe). It produced several aftershocks, including one that measured a magnitude of 6.1 seven minutes after the main shock.

Tectonic setting
The island of Hawaii is affected by earthquakes related to three main causes. Some are associated with the movement of magma and tend to be shallow focus (less than  depth). The largest earthquakes are those caused by overall gravitational spreading of the volcano, whether within the volcano's flanks or at the base of the volcanic pile. They tend to have focal depths in the range . The final group of earthquakes are those caused by flexure of the oceanic lithosphere underlying the island as a result of loading by the volcano.

Earthquake
The depth shows that it was in the mantle lithosphere, beneath the neutral surface with a mechanism consistent with tangential tension. The depth and mechanism are consistent with tangential compression above the neutral surface.

Modified Mercalli Intensities were VII–VIII (Very strong–Severe) on the western side of the island of Hawaii, and VI (Strong) on the eastern side of Maui. Intensity V (Moderate) shaking was felt all the way to Oahu, where patches of moderate damage were reported. The earthquake caused property damage, injuries, landslides, power outages, and airport delays and closures.  Governor Linda Lingle issued a disaster declaration for the entire state.

Damage

The most severe damage caused by the earthquake was focused on the north and western sides of the island of Hawaii. On the Big Island, many houses had large cracks and broken windows, and at least 61 buildings were destroyed and red-tagged by officials. Almost all houses in west Hawaii reported extensive internal damage but most avoided significant structural damage, the reason being that most of the buildings in the area around the epicenter of the earthquake have been built in the last few decades and are well constructed. Even so, over $200 million in damage occurred.

The largest and most luxurious hotels on the Island of Hawaii also happened to be clustered within  of the earthquake's epicenter along the Kohala coast. The 1965 Mauna Kea Beach Hotel had its entire south end collapse, and the hotel's top floor was considered "destroyed." The hotel closed December 1 after a month-long inspection revealed that the building was unsafe and in danger of collapse. After a $150 million renovation, the hotel had a soft reopening on December 20, 2008, and officially reopened in March 2009. The Hapuna Beach Prince Hotel was temporarily evacuated after the earthquake due to structural damage, broken glass and flooding caused by broken water pipes. The Surety Kohala Corporation assessed the structural integrity to their Kohala Ditch, which functioned as a tourist attraction for 10 years.

Many roads and bridges collapsed or had deep cracks, and clean-up crews had to work for days to remove debris from the countless landslides. Many landmarks on the island were greatly affected. The Kalahikiola Congregational Church in Kohala was destroyed due to the collapse of the church's stone walls; the Hawi smoke stack, a relic of the old sugarcane trade, completely collapsed as well. The Hulihee Palace in Kailua Kona suffered extensive structural damage. Another popular tourist area, Kealakekua Bay, home of the white monument to Captain James Cook, was swept over by massive landslides that caused the entire bay and its surrounding areas to momentarily disappear in a thick cloud of brown dust.

Mauna Kea Observatory

During the earthquake and aftershocks, a number of the telescopes at the Mauna Kea Observatories sustained minor damage, primarily Kecks 1 and 2 at the W. M. Keck Observatory, and the Canada–France–Hawaii Telescope (CFHT).  The CFHT was operational and back online as of October 19, but the Kecks were not restored to full operation until February 28, 2007.

Blackouts
Power plants on Maui and the Big Island automatically shut off power to prevent damage, and generators tripped on Oahu, causing overloads in the electrical grid.  The Oahu power outages lasted 14 hours in some locations; only half of Hawaiian Electric Company's (HECO) Oahu customers had power restored before 9 pm, while outages generally lasted to about 5 pm on Maui and Hawaii. Power was restored to all HECO circuits by 1:55 am; however, there were isolated blackouts due to local problems, such as blown fuses. Power in Laie and Kahuku was not restored until 3 am.  In Honolulu and Kahe, HECO generators shut down, and other generators tried to compensate, resulting in uneven loads on Oahu's electrical network and causing the system to shut down to prevent damage.

Images

See also

Kiholo Bay
List of earthquakes in 2006
List of earthquakes in Hawaii
List of earthquakes in the United States
Lists of 21st-century earthquakes

References

Sources

External links

 Report on the declaration of a state of emergency – NBC News

 Historic Palace Damaged, but Blessed – NBC News
 Lessons learned from the 2006 Kiholo Bay earthquakes – West Hawaii Today
 Continued Rumblings of the 2006 Kiholo Bay Earthquake – United States Geological Survey
 

Hawaii earthquake
Hawaii earthquake
Earthquakes in Hawaii
2006 in Hawaii
October 2006 events in the United States